Cartier Project is a Slovenian TV film based upon the novel The Cartier Project by Miha Mazzini. The Slovenian title is Operacija Cartier.

Produced by TV Slovenija, 90 minutes, 1991.
Director: Miran Zupanič
Screenplay: Miha Mazzini
Cinematographer: Radovan Čok
Editor: Neva Fajon
Music: Urban Koder

Cast

Borut Veselko (Egon)
Faruk Begoli (Selim)
Haris Burina (Ibro)
Srečo Špik (Poet)
Judita Zidar (Karla)
Brane Grubar (Lojze)
Žan Marolt (Fačo)
Ratko Polič (Guard)

Awards

Slovenian film of the year, selected by the audience
Borut Veselko - actor of the year, selected by the audience
Winner of Prix CIRCOM REGIONAL Fiction 1992

External links

 

1991 television films
1991 films
Slovenian television films
Films based on Slovenian novels
1991 comedy-drama films
Films about social issues
Films about murder
Films about suicide
1991 directorial debut films